United States Navy submarines, surface ships, and aircraft launch torpedoes, missiles, and autonomous undersea vehicles as part of training exercises.  Typically, these training munitions have no warhead and are recovered from the sea and reused.  Similarly, new naval weapons under development are launched at sea in performance trials.  These experimental units also need to be recovered, in their case to obtain evaluation data.  At various points in history, newly manufactured torpedoes were fired as a quality control measure and these, too, had to be recovered before issuing them to the fleet.  The U.S. Navy has used a variety of boats to accomplish the retrieval of these test and training munitions.  As their missions evolved over the last century they have been variously known as torpedo retrievers, torpedo weapon retrievers, torpedo recovery boats, range support craft, and multi-purpose craft.

These vessels have usually been confined to firing ranges close to port and have not engaged in combat.  The individual service histories of these boats are consequently modest, undramatic, and frequently undocumented.  While their individual histories may be lost, as a class they have been part of the Navy for a century and have served around the world.  Their modern types remain in service with the Navy today, continuing to provide an essential function.

History and operation 

The first sinking of a ship by a self-propelled torpedo occurred in 1878, and by World War I, torpedoes played a pivotal role in naval warfare as German U-boats sought to close the North Atlantic to allied shipping.  While the United States had experimented with early torpedoes, the U-boat threat in World War I focused undersea warfare  efforts on anti-submarine technologies rather than torpedoes.  At the close of World War I, U.S. defense spending was reduced, further curtailing the development of torpedo systems.  Consequently, U.S. Navy experience with torpedoes was quite limited prior to World War II.  At the start of the conflict there was no one in the Navy who had ever seen or heard a torpedo detonate either in test or war.  No U.S. submarine sank a vessel using a torpedo until 1941.  In this environment of economy, testing and trainining were limited.  Only two types of small purpose-built torpedo retrievers, 40' and 42' boats, were built.  There were few enough of these that it was common for unspecialized motorboats to recover exercise torpedoes.World War II brought about a large increase in U.S. Navy use of torpedoes.  Prior to the war, about 60 torpedoes per month were manufactured.  Over the next four years nearly 50,000 were produced.  Training and testing capabilities expanded significantly, including new, more capable torpedo retrievers, notably the 63' vessels converted from aviation crash boats.  Even so, other small vessels continued to be pressed into service as retrievers.  For example, during March 1945 the rescue tug ATR-63 was detailed to retrieve exercise torpedoes off Pearl Harbor five times.  Two exercises were aborted due to high winds and seas, and in the other three exercises she recovered 25 torpedoes, including some dropped by aircraft and others fired by submarines USS Cod and USS Cero.

The most recent generations of torpedo retrievers are much more than that, as their designations suggest.  They are now categorized as range support craft, and multi-purpose craft.  They not only retrieve torpedoes, but new classes of weapons including missiles, and autonomous undersea vehicles.  They launch drones and other targets.  They tow various targets and lower sound transducers into the sea to simulate enemy vessels.  They are capable of extended operation away from port, sailing independently, and have capacity to retrieve many exercise weapons without having to return to base.

For most of their history, torpedo retrievers have been manned by Navy enlisted personnel.  A recent development is the outsourcing of operation and maintenance of these vessels.  While the Navy continues to own the boats, civilian contractors and crew will run many of them.   The Pacific Missile Range Facility, the Southern California Offshore Range, and the Naval Submarine Support Command at Pearl Harbor have all moved toward placing civilian crews aboard their range support craft.

Torpedo retrieval techniques 
Exercise torpedoes are intended to float on the surface when they reach the end of their runs.  Various techniques have been used to achieve this.  For example, the submarine-launched Mark 14 torpedo of World War II replaced its warhead with an exercise head filled with water.  At the end of the torpedo's run, compressed air would expel the water, lightening the weapon sufficiently to float.

In order to recover a floating torpedo it is first necessary to find it.  Prior to the advent of electric torpedoes, which first reached the U.S. fleet in September 1943, torpedo recovery boats could follow the stream of bubbles generated by the weapon's propulsion system.  Also aiding the retrievers was that early torpedoes were primarily used against surface ships, so they ran at a set, shallow depth.  They ran straight, with no ability to change course once fired, making their ultimate destination somewhat predictable.  Exercise torpedoes have typically been painted in bright colors, often international orange, to stand out in the water.

Modern torpedoes have electric propulsion systems that leave no trail of bubbles for a retriever to follow.  They also rely on homing and other technologies that can change a weapon's course once fired.  Further complicating location is that torpedoes are more likely to be used against deep-diving submarines, rather than surface ships, so not only is their course less predictable, but also the depth at which they run.  Today, finding spent torpedoes is aided by dye packets that vividly color the sea where they complete their run.  Some torpedoes have also been equipped with an electronic end-of-run locator, a "pinger" producing a high-frequency sound that can be detected by  hydrophone equipment.

Once a torpedo has been located, the next step in retrieval is to attach a line to it.  A variety of snares and slings that encircle the body of the weapon, and various nosepieces have been used to attach lines to the otherwise smooth object.  Slings and nose cages have been attached to the weapons either by swimmers, by sailors working from a small boat, or by sailors operating from the torpedo retriever itself.

Having located and captured a spent torpedo, it could now be recovered.  The early 40' and 42' torpedo retrievers had no ability to bring a weapon on board.  Their crews would snare a floating torpedo, tie a line to it, and tow it to a dock or ship where it could be craned out of the water.  In the absence of purpose-built torpedo retrievers, a wide variety of small boats performed similarly.  Disadvantages of these early vessels included their inability to operate in difficult sea conditions, to stay on station overnight, to navigate on their own, and to recover more than one torpedo per trip.  These early retrievers had no radios.  They would communicate by raising a "bravo" signal flag to indicate they were recovering a torpedo.  Beginning with the 63' boats and continuing to the present day, all U.S. Navy torpedo retrievers have an inclined aft deck or ramp equipped with rollers that allow torpedoes to be winched aboard directly from the sea.  These larger vessels could recover multiple torpedoes before off-loading to a shore facility or ship.

Torpedo retriever alternatives 
Torpedo retriever boats are but one of the ways spent exercise and test weapons have been recovered by the Navy. Malfunctioning torpedoes that sink require different approaches. Divers, nets, grapples, and magnetic detectors have been used to search for lost weapons starting as early as 1919. Beginning in the 1950s, the Navy experimented with training a variety of marine mammals to recover sunken torpedoes. Orca, beluga whales, pilot whales, and bottle-nosed dolphins were all trained with some level of success. As robots became more capable and cheaper, this program was discontinued.

Helicopters are also capable of recovering floating torpedoes using specialized nets, but they suffer from a number of disadvantages compared to torpedo recovery boats.  They are in short supply, have limited flight times, are expensive, have limited lifting capacity, and can pick up just a single torpedo per trip.

The United States Air Force has also operated drone and missile retriever boats to support its own training and development requirements and continues to do so to the present day.

U.S. Navy torpedo retrievers 
The Navy's rules regarding these non-commissioned vessels have varied over the decades, but for much of their history they were not entitled to an official name or even a pennant number painted on their bow.  These nameless vessels have simply been known by their hull number.  Unofficial pennant numbers and names have been assigned from time to time at their bases.  This has led to historical confusion since vessels with the same unofficial name or pennant number have been in service simultaneously.  The vessels described below are listed in order of their introduction to the fleet.

40' Torpedo retriever 
The navy built a number of these small, wooden torpedo retrievers as early as 1924.  They were driven by twin 150 horsepower Palmer Marine gasoline engines.  Many were declared surplus after World War II and sold to the public for prices as low as $250.

42' Torpedo retriever 
These boats had white cedar hulls framed with oak.  After World War II many of these vessels were declared surplus and sold to the public for prices as low as $750. Nonetheless, a few of them served into the 1950s.

63' Torpedo retriever 

This class of torpedo retrievers began as conversions from 63' aviation crash boats, designated auxiliary vessel - rescue (AVR) by the Navy.  Their aft cockpits were modified with a ramp down to the water.  Hand-cranked winches were installed on deck to haul torpedoes out of the water and onto the ramps.  The configuration of these boats varied based on the model of AVR from which they were converted.  Some gasoline powered boats could reach 20 knots, while others powered by twin Gray Marine 165 diesel engines, reached a speed of 11 knots.  They sailed with a crew of six.

One of these vessels was converted into the base fishing boat, Big Wheel, at Naval Station Key West.  This former torpedo retriever hosted President Harry S. Truman on  fishing trips in 1949 and 1951.

72' Torpedo recovery boat 

These vessels were built with two different pilot house configurations.  The Mark I boat had an open pilot house, while the Mark II boat enclosed the helm station to protect it from the weather and seas.  They were built by several companies.  Harbor Boat Building Co. of San Pedro, California built a single 72' torpedo retriever as did National Steel and Shipbuilding Company.  Tacoma Boatbuilding Company in Tacoma, Washington was awarded a contract for three boats in May 1960.  The total contract award was $394,300.  Between 1954 and 1956, Berg Shipyard in Blaine, Washington built six of the boats.  J. M. Martinac Shipbuilding of Tacoma, Washington received a contract for $294,723 in 1957.  That same year, Elizabeth City Shipyard in Elizabeth City, North Carolina received a contract to build three boats for $583,000.

At full load they displaced . Their hulls were constructed of double-planked wood. They could reach a speed of 18 knots driven by twin Detroit Diesel 12V71T1 engines. These boats could carry  of torpedoes on deck. They were crewed by seven enlisted men.

85' Torpedo retriever 

These vessels were built by Tacoma Boatbuilding. They were constructed of welded aluminum plates. They displaced 61 tons at full load. They could reach a speed of 21 knots. They had two propellers driven by two General Motors 16V-71 Diesel engines that produced 1,160 horsepower. They had deck space to recover as many as eight torpedoes. These boats sailed with a crew of five men. Although their hull registration numbers remained in the torpedo retriever sequence, they were referred to as "weapon retriever boats" at the Pacific Missile Range Facility where two were based.

65' Torpedo recovery boat 

Peterson Builders, Inc. built six of these vessels at its shipyard in Sturgeon Bay, Wisconsin between 1967 and 1968. They were constructed of welded aluminum plates. These boats cruised at 19 knots driven by two propellers  in diameter. Each was driven by a 12V171 Detroit Diesel engines which produced 400 horsepower. Their fuel tanks had a capacity of 800 gallons, which gave them an unrefueled range of 280 miles. These boats could carry as many as four torpedoes at a time. They had a crew of six. Their original cost was reported as $250,000.

100' Torpedo weapons retriever 
Eight vessels of this class were built. Three were built by Western Boat Building at Tacoma, Washington, one by Dorchester Shipbuilding Corporation at Dorchester, New Jersey, and three by Peterson Builders, Inc. at Sturgeon Bay, Wisconsin. Their design was based on the PGM-39-class gunboat. They displaced 165 tons at full load. Their hulls were constructed of welded steel plates, while their deck and house structure was built of aluminum plate. Their top speed was 18 knots and normal cruising speed was 15 knots. They had two propellers powered by four General Motors 12V-149 Diesel engines. These boats had a single ramp through the transom to recover weapons. They were crewed by 15 enlisted men led by a chief quartermaster. They could remain at sea for 5 days and had an unrefueled range of 2,000 nautical miles. Their large size allowed them to carry 17 tons of torpedoes on deck.

85' Torpedo weapons retriever 
Tacoma Boatbuilding was awarded a $1.9 million for these two vessels in September 1976. They displaced 66 tons. They were constructed of welded aluminum plates. Their maximum speed was 14 knots, driven by two Detroit Diesel 12V149 engines. They could carry up to eight torpedoes on deck. They had an unrefueled range of 680 miles.

120' Torpedo weapons retriever 

Ten vessels of this class were produced.  Marinette Marine designed these boats in response to a Navy bid request.  In July 1983 the company was awarded a firm contract for five torpedo weapons retrievers.  The contract price on the initial five boats was $12 million. An option for three additional vessels under this contract was exercised in October 1983.  Marinette Marine was awarded a contract for the last two boats in January 1985 for delivery in 1986.  The contract price for these last two was $7.1 million.

These boats were built of welded steel plates. They displaced 213 tons at full load. They could cruise at 16 knots, driven by two fixed-pitch propellers powered by two Caterpillar D 3512 2,350 horsepower diesel engines. They had an unrefueled range of 1,700 nautical miles. These boats had a single ramp through the transom to recover weapons. They were large enough to carry 14 Mark 48 torpedoes on deck. There was berthing aboard for 18 crew. This class of vessels represented a significant performance improvement over smaller torpedo retrievers, in that they could remain on station continuously for a week, operate in heavier seas, carry more spent torpedoes, and had improved navigation equipment.

85' Torpedo weapons retriever 
These vessels were built by SWATH Ocean Systems at Chula Vista, California. They are constructed of welded aluminum plates. They are powered by twin Caterpillar C32 Diesel engines. Their maximum speed in 20 knots, while cruising speed is 16 knots.

95' Multi-purpose craft 
These boats were designed by Hockema & Whalen Associates. In 2012 the Navy awarded a firm contract for three of these vessels, with an option for a fourth, to Modutech Marine Inc., of Tacoma, Washington. The original price for the three was $24.4 million. They are constructed of welded aluminum plate. These, in turn are powered by two Caterpillar C32 Diesel engines which each develop 1,450 horsepower each. These boats are equipped with a Key Power  bow thruster to improve maneuverability. They have an unrefueled range of 1,200 miles.

They have four double-bunk staterooms, and the ability to berth another four people on a temporary basis. Their at-sea endurance is seven to ten days.

114' Range Support Craft 

Marine Group Boat Works built four vessels of this class at its Chula Vista, California shipyard. The initial contract for three boats was awarded in 2009. The four are reported to have cost $42 million. They are constructed of welded aluminum plates. They are powered by twin Caterpillar 3512 Diesel engines which produce 1,800 horsepower each. Among the technical innovations in their design, is the ability to run on B100 biodiesel and the use of Seakeeper gyroscopic stabilization to allow them to operate in heavier seas.

Other Torpedo retrievers 
The Navy has employed a variety of boats as torpedo retrievers that were not produced as part of a class.  Several were purchased from oil-field supply companies, and several were transferred from the U.S. Air Force.  Their configurations were unique, but they were characterized by a large, open aft deck on which to carry spent munitions.

Retired torpedo retrievers 
A number of surplus torpedo retrievers have been given to the Sea Scouts and other public organizations, and some are still afloat today.

See also

Torpedo trials craft
List of yard and district craft of the United States Navy 
§ Torpedo Trials Craft (YTT)

References 

Ships of the United States Navy
Torpedo boats of the United States Navy